Hit Radio, Hitradio or HitRadio  may refer to:

 Hit Radio (Morocco), a Moroccan radio station specialized in mainstream pop music
 HitRadio Veronica (Sky Radio), a Dutch radio station broadcasting over the internet
 HitRadio Veronica, a former Dutch radio station
 Hitradio Ö3, an Austrian radio station
 Hit Radio 87.6, a radio station in North Central Victoria, Australia